George A. Williamson (born July 11, 1938) was an American politician in the state of Florida.

Williamson was born in Chattanooga, Tennessee. He attended the University of Miami, Duke University, and University of North Carolina at Chapel Hill and is an attorney. He served in the Florida State Senate from 1977 to 1980, as a member of the Republican Party (29th district). He also served in the Florida House of Representatives from 1972 to 1976.

References

1938 births
Living people
Republican Party Florida state senators